"Grown and Sexy" is the third US single and second international single from Chamillionaire's album, The Sound of Revenge. The music video is set up to have a futuristic feel to it.

Chamillionaire's appearances on Ciara's "Get Up" and Frankie J.'s "That Girl" have proven to be successful singles as well as charting No.1 with Ridin'. However, the single failed to chart anywhere in the U.S., but did chart in the UK, peaking at #35, much smaller peak than that of "Ridin" which made #2 there. It charted In the Piczo Countdown at #7 In November 2006.

Track listing

CD1

 "Grown and Sexy" (clean album version)
 "Turn it Up" (radio edit)

CD2

 "Grown and Sexy" (explicit album version)
 "Turn It Up" (Dizzee Rascal remix)
 "Ridin"
 "Grown and Sexy" (instrumental)

Promo

 "Grown and Sexy" (Radio Edit)
 "Grown and Sexy" (Radio Edit - No Intro)

2006 singles
Chamillionaire songs
Universal Records singles
Songs written by Chamillionaire

Music videos directed by Rich Lee
2005 songs